Whitestone may refer to:

Places 
 Whitestone, Alaska, an unincorporated community
 Whitestone, Devon, a village in the United Kingdom
 Whitestone, Ontario, a township in Canada and a community within the township
 Whitestone, Queens, a neighborhood in New York City
 Whitestone, Warwickshire, a suburb of Nuneaton, a town in the United Kingdom

People 
 Annabelle Whitestone (born 1946), English concert manager
 Frank Whitestone, creator of lobby group nthellworld
 Heather Whitestone (born 1973), beauty queen and conservative activist 
 Henry Whitestone (1819–1893), Irish architect in Louisville, Kentucky

Other uses 
 Whitestone FM, later Port FM, a local radio station in Timaru, New Zealand
 Whitestone (album), a 1985 album by jazz guitarist Joe Pass
 Whitestone Bank, a sand bank off the Isle of Man
 Whitestone Branch, a branch of the Long Island Rail Road in New York City
 Whitestone Cheese, a company in Oamaru, New Zealand
 Whitestone Expressway, part of Interstate 678 in New York City
 Whitestone Park, a sports ground in Peebles, Scotland
 Whitestone River, a tributary of the Mararoa River in New Zealand
 Whitestone School, an independent school in Bulawayo, Zimbabwe
 Whitestone, a fictional city-state in the Dungeons & Dragons web series Critical Role

See also 
 Whitstone (disambiguation)
 White Stone (disambiguation)
 Mount Whitestone, Queensland, a locality in the Lockyer valley
 White Stone, Virginia, a town in Lancaster County
 Whitestone Village, Yukon, a community in Canada